Gonodontodes dispar is a moth of the family Noctuidae. It is found on Cuba. An adult male of this species was collected in Key Largo, Florida, in 2009.

References

Moths described in 1913
Catocalinae